Luiz Carlos Cirne Lima de Lorenzi (born 11 August 1972), commonly known as Lisca, is a Brazilian football coach.

He is often referred as Lisca Doido (Crazy Lisca or Mad Lisca in Portuguese) due to his extravagant celebrations.

Career
Born in Porto Alegre, Lisca played as a forward for Internacional's youth setup before retiring at the age of 17 due to studies. He started his coaching career in the very same club, joining as coach of their youth categories in 1990. In 1995, he moved to São Paulo, again assigned to the youth categories, but returned to his previous club the following year.

Lisca's first experience as first team trainer came in 2001, with Ulbra. After being dismissed, he returned to the youth setup and took over Grêmio and Fluminense before returning to Inter in 2006. He was also in charge of the latter's first team during the first five matches of the 2007 Campeonato Gaúcho, as the club opted to use a B-team in the tournament.

In February 2008, Lisca was appointed Brasil de Pelotas head coach. He was named trainer of Juventude's B-team in the same year.

After managing Porto Alegre, Luverdense (two stints), Caxias and Novo Hamburgo, Lisca returned to Juventude on 30 July 2012. He left the club in December of the following year, being appointed at the helm of Série B club Náutico.

Lisca resigned from Timbu on 7 May 2014, and joined Sampaio Corrêa on 22 July. He was sacked from the latter on 20 October, after being heavily criticised by the media due to the club's poor performances.

Lisca returned to Náutico in March 2015, being dismissed on 8 September. Late in the month he was appointed in charge of Ceará, seriously threatened with relegation to Série C. After managing to avoid the drop, he renewed his contract for the following season on 30 November.

On 28 March 2016 Lisca was sacked by Ceará, after a poor run of form. On 29 June he was appointed Joinville head coach, being sacked on 16 September.

On 18 November 2016, Internacional announced Lisca as their new head coach, with the club having only three games in hand and being in the relegation zone. He left the club after failing to avoid the club's first-ever relegation to the second division, being replaced by Antônio Carlos Zago.

On 18 July 2017, Lisca was appointed Paraná head coach, but was dismissed on 2 September after altercations with the club's board and supposedly assaulting the club's assistant coach Matheus Costa. On 8 October he was named at the helm of Guarani, leaving the club in the end of the year.

On 10 December 2017, Lisca was named Criciúma head coach, but resigned the following 29 January after just four matches. On 4 June 2018, he returned to Ceará in the place of departing Jorginho.

On 22 April 2019, after losing the year's Campeonato Cearense, Lisca was sacked. The following 30 January, he replaced Red Bull Bragantino-bound Felipe Conceição at the helm of América Mineiro. He led the Coelho to the semifinals of the 2020 Copa do Brasil, while also achieving promotion from the 2020 Série B.

On 14 June 2021, after seven winless matches, Lisca resigned. On 20 July, he replaced Marcelo Cabo at the helm of Vasco da Gama in the second division, but resigned on 8 September after 12 matches.

On 27 June 2022, Lisca was named head coach of second division side Sport Recife. On 19 July, after just four matches in charge, he left the club to take over Santos in the top tier.

On 12 September 2022, Lisca left Santos on a mutual agreement, and was named head coach of fellow top tier side Avaí the following day. He was sacked from the latter side on 24 October, after six straight losses in seven matches.

Personal life
Lisca's great grandfather Carlos de Lorenzi and his grandfather Jorge de Lorenzi were both goalkeepers for Internacional in the 1910s and in the 1940s, respectively. His brother Jorge de Lorenzi Neto also works with football, as an assistant coach.

Coaching statistics

Honours
Porto Alegre
Campeonato Gaúcho Série A2: 2009

Luverdense
Copa Pantanal: 2011
Copa FMF: 2011

Juventude
Copa FGF: 2012

References

External links
 
 Profile at Soccerpunter.com

1972 births
Living people
Sportspeople from Porto Alegre
Brazilian football managers
Campeonato Brasileiro Série A managers
Campeonato Brasileiro Série B managers
Campeonato Brasileiro Série C managers
Campeonato Brasileiro Série D managers
Grêmio Esportivo Brasil managers
Porto Alegre Futebol Clube managers
Luverdense Esporte Clube managers
Sociedade Esportiva e Recreativa Caxias do Sul managers
Esporte Clube Novo Hamburgo managers
Esporte Clube Juventude managers
Clube Náutico Capibaribe managers
Sampaio Corrêa Futebol Clube managers
Ceará Sporting Club managers
Joinville Esporte Clube managers
Sport Club Internacional managers
Paraná Clube managers
Guarani FC managers
Criciúma Esporte Clube managers
América Futebol Clube (MG) managers
CR Vasco da Gama managers
Sport Club do Recife managers
Santos FC managers
Avaí FC managers